The 2014–15 FA Cup, also called the 2014–15 FA Challenge Cup, was the 134th occurrence of the FA Cup, the main domestic cup in English football and the oldest knockout competition in the world. It was the first season when the BBC and BT Sport hosted televised matches, seven years after the BBC lost the rights to ITV. The 2014–15 season's Cup also marked the first time that 3G (third generation) artificial pitches were allowed in all rounds of the competition, designed to lower costs for maintenance. After Queens Park Rangers (the first English artificial pitch, from 1981 to 1988), Luton Town, Oldham Athletic and Preston North End trialled artificial pitches in the 1980s, they were made illegal in 1995.

The defending champions were Premier League side Arsenal, after they beat Hull City 3–2 in the previous final on 17 May 2014.

The semi-finals took place at Wembley Stadium, as they have since 2008, to offset the cost of the new stadium, despite protestations from some supporters. The stadium also hosted the final.

The winner of the FA Cup earns automatic qualification to the 2015–16 UEFA Europa League group stages. However, as Arsenal qualified for the UEFA Champions League via their league position, Southampton, the highest placed team in the 2014–15 Premier League not already Europe-qualified took this Europa League place. In a change to Europa League rules, qualifying slots for national cup winners no longer pass to the runners-up if the winners have already qualified through their league.

Arsenal retained the trophy, beating Aston Villa 4–0 in the final.

Notably, EFL Championship side Reading F.C. reached the semi-finals, for only the second time in their history.

Teams

Qualifying rounds 

All of the competing teams that were not members of either the Premier League or the Football League had to compete in the qualifying rounds to win a place in the First Round Proper.

First Round Proper
The First Round draw took place on 27 October 2014 at 19:00, at St George's Park. A total of 80 teams competed, 32 of which had progressed from the Fourth Qualifying Round and 48 from League One and League Two of the Football League. The lowest ranked sides in this round were Norton United and Warrington Town, both of whom competed at level 8 of English football.

Second Round Proper
The Second Round draw took place on 10 November 2014 at 19:00, at the National Football Museum. A total of forty teams competed, all of which had progressed from the First Round. The lowest ranked side in this round was Warrington Town, who competed at level 8 of English football. Chesterfield initially faced expulsion from the tournament after fielding an ineligible player, but were required to play their second round fixture against Milton Keynes Dons again.

Scunthorpe United's penalty win over Worcester City set a new competition record for most penalty kicks taken with 32.

Third Round Proper 
The Third Round draw took place on 8 December 2014 at 19:00, at The Deep in Hull, and was broadcast live on BBC Two. A total of 64 teams  competed, 20 of which had progressed from the Second Round and 44 clubs from the Premier League and Football League Championship. The lowest ranked side in this round was Blyth Spartans, who compete at level 7 of English football.

Fourth Round Proper 
The Fourth Round draw took place on 5 January 2015 at 19:30, in the clubhouse of AFC Wimbledon at Kingsmeadow, Kingston upon Thames, and was broadcast live on BBC One. In the draw the title holders Arsenal drew a trip to Brighton against Brighton & Hove Albion while the lowest ranked side in this round, Cambridge United (who compete at level 4 of English football) drew Premier League club Manchester United. A total of 32 teams  competed, all of which had progressed from the third round.

Fifth Round Proper 
The Fifth Round draw took place on 26 January 2015 at 19:20 on The One Show, which was broadcast live on BBC One, and the matches took place between 14 and 16 February 2015. In the draw, title holders Arsenal drew Middlesbrough (who eliminated Manchester City in fourth round) and Bradford City (who eliminated Chelsea in fourth round) were rewarded a home tie against Sunderland. The lowest ranked sides in this round were Bradford City and Preston North End (who competed at level 3 of English football)

Sixth Round Proper 
The Sixth Round draw took place on 16 February 2015 at 19:35 on BBC One, and the regular matches were played between 7 and 9 March. The lowest ranked side in this round were Bradford City (who competed at level 3 of English football).

Semi-finals 
The semi-final draw took place on 9 March 2015 at approximately 21:45, at Old Trafford, Manchester, and was broadcast on BBC One after the match between Manchester United and Arsenal. In the draw, title holders Arsenal drew Reading, while Aston Villa drew Liverpool. The matches were played at Wembley Stadium on 18 and 19 April 2015. The lowest ranked side in this round were Reading (who competed at level 2 of English football).

Final

Top scorers

Broadcasting rights
The domestic broadcasting rights for the competition were held by the BBC and subscription channel BT Sport. The BBC regained the rights from ITV after six years, while BT Sport extended its existing deal carried over from obtaining ESPN's rights in February 2013. The FA Cup Final had to be broadcast live on UK terrestrial television under the Ofcom code of protected sporting events.

These matches were broadcast live on UK television:

Welsh language channel S4C broadcast the first round proper match between Wrexham and Woking. This was the only FA Cup match of the season that S4C broadcast.

International broadcasters

Notes

References 

 
FA Cup seasons
Fa Cup
FA Cup